Evan Earl Battey (born September 27, 1998) is an American professional basketball player for Rilski Sportist of the National Basketball League (NBL). He played college basketball for the Colorado Buffaloes. He was named second-team All-Pac-12 as a senior in 2022.

High school career
Battey started playing high school basketball at the Los Angeles Center for Enriched Studies in Los Angeles. He averaged 11 points and 11 rebounds per game as a freshman. As a sophomore, Battey averaged 20 points and 14 rebounds per game, leading his team to its second straight CIF Los Angeles City Section Division IV title. For his junior season, he transferred to Villa Park High School in Villa Park, California. In his fifth game of the season, Battey scored 44 points, two shy of the school record. As a junior, he averaged 24 points and 12 rebounds per game. Battey was ruled ineligible for his senior season, as he had repeated ninth grade and exhausted all eight semesters of athletic eligibility. While sidelined, he served as a coach for Villa Park's big men and junior varsity team. He committed to playing college basketball for Colorado over offers from Arizona State, Miami (Florida) and Purdue, among others.

College career
Battey sat out for the 2017–18 season as an academic redshirt, because he did not graduate from high school in four years. In December 2017, he suffered a stroke while playing basketball with his friends, and had two seizures later in the day. Battey rehabilitated for five months, including physical therapy and speech therapy. As a freshman at Colorado, he averaged 8.1 points and 4.4 rebounds per game. In his sophomore season, Battey became a regular starter and averaged 8.9 points and 5.9 rebounds per game. As a junior, he averaged 10.1 points and 5.3 rebounds per game, and was named to the All-Pac-12 honorable mention. As a senior, Battey averaged 12.4 points and 4.7 rebounds per game and was named second-team All-Pac-12.

Career statistics

College

|-
| style="text-align:left;"| 2017–18
| style="text-align:left;"| Colorado
| style="text-align:center;" colspan="11"|  Redshirt
|-
| style="text-align:left;"| 2018–19
| style="text-align:left;"| Colorado
| 36 || 11 || 21.3 || .484 || .188 || .705 || 4.4 || 1.2 || .5 || .3 || 8.1
|-
| style="text-align:left;"| 2019–20
| style="text-align:left;"| Colorado
| 32 || 32 || 24.8 || .526 || .353 || .694 || 5.9 || 1.0 || .5 || .3 || 8.9
|-
| style="text-align:left;"| 2020–21
| style="text-align:left;"| Colorado
| 32 || 32 || 25.7 || .498 || .118 || .825 || 5.3 || 1.0 || .4 || .3 || 10.1
|-
| style="text-align:left;"| 2021–22
| style="text-align:left;"| Colorado
| 33 || 33 || 28.5 || .502 || .488 || .759 || 4.7 || 1.2 || .6 || .5 || 12.4
|- class="sortbottom"
| style="text-align:center;" colspan="2"| Career
| 133 || 108 || 25.0 || .502 || .390 || .748 || 5.0 || 1.1 || .5 || .4 || 9.8

Personal life
Battey's father, Earl III, played college baseball at UCLA and is a longtime Los Angeles Police Department officer. His grandfather, Earl Jr., was a five-time Major League Baseball All-Star and a three-time Gold Glove winner. Battey's uncle, Ed Sanders, was a boxer and won the gold medal at the 1952 Summer Olympics.

References

External links
Colorado Buffaloes bio

1998 births
Living people
Basketball players from Los Angeles
Power forwards (basketball)
Colorado Buffaloes men's basketball players
American men's basketball players